Brit Awards 1987 was the 7th edition of the Brit Awards, an annual pop music awards ceremony in the United Kingdom. It was organised by the British Phonographic Industry and took place on 9 February 1987 at Grosvenor House Hotel in London.

The awards ceremony, hosted by Jonathan King, was televised by the BBC.

Performances
 Chris de Burgh – "The Lady in Red"
 Curiosity Killed the Cat – "Down to Earth"
 Five Star – "Can't Wait Another Minute"
 Level 42 – "Lessons in Love"
 Simply Red – "Holding Back the Years"
 Spandau Ballet – "Through the Barricades"
 Whitney Houston – "How Will I Know"

Winners and nominees

Outstanding Contribution to Music
 Eric Clapton

Multiple nominations and awards
The following artists received multiple awards and/or nominations.

References

External links
Brit Awards 1987 at Brits.co.uk

Brit Awards
Brit Awards
BRIT Awards
BRIT Awards
Brit Awards
Brit Awards